The 1989 Mercantile Credit Classic was the tenth edition of the professional snooker tournament which took place from 1–15 January 1989 with ITV coverage beginning on the 7th. The tournament was played at the Norbreck Castle Hotel, Blackpool, Lancashire.

Reigning UK Champion Doug Mountjoy won his second title in succession, beating Wayne Jones 13–11 in the final.

Main draw

Final

Century breaks
(Including qualifying rounds)

143  Nigel Gilbert
138  Tony Knowles
137  Wayne Jones
134  Willie Thorne
127  Malcolm Bradley
127  Marcel Gauvreau
121  Graham Cripsey
121  Jimmy White
116, 105  Cliff Thorburn
109  Tony Chappel
109  Mark Johnston-Allen
104  Les Dodd
105  John Parrott
100  Dene O'Kane

References

Classic (snooker)
Classic
Classic
Sport in Blackpool
Classic